Storsølnkletten (or Store Sølnkletten, Sølnkletten) is a prominent mountain in Alvdal Municipality in Innlandet county, Norway.

The mountain is easily recognizable due to its saddle form with two peaks. The lower summit is known as Spisskletten or Storsølnkletten lille.

See also
List of mountains of Norway

References

Alvdal
Mountains of Innlandet